A divisor is the second operand of a division.
A divisor may also refer to
 Divisor, an integer that divides evenly another integer
 Divisor (ring theory), a generalization of the preceding concept
 Divisor (algebraic geometry), a generalization of codimension one subvarieties of algebraic varieties